Pagliacci (literal translation, "Clowns") is an Italian opera in a prologue and two acts, with music and libretto by Ruggero Leoncavallo. The opera tells the tale of Canio, actor and leader of a commedia dell'arte theatrical company, who murders his wife Nedda and her lover Silvio on stage during a performance. Pagliacci premiered at the Teatro Dal Verme in Milan on 21 May 1892, conducted by Arturo Toscanini, with Adelina Stehle as Nedda, Fiorello Giraud as Canio, Victor Maurel as Tonio, and Mario Ancona as Silvio. Soon after its Italian premiere, the opera played in London (with Nellie Melba as Nedda) and in New York (on 15 June 1893, with Agostino Montegriffo as Canio). Pagliacci is the composer's only opera that is still widely performed.

Pagliacci is often staged with Cavalleria rusticana by Pietro Mascagni, a double bill known colloquially as "Cav/Pag".

Origin and disputes
Leoncavallo was a little-known composer when Pietro Mascagni's Cavalleria rusticana premiered around 1890. After seeing Mascagni's success, Leoncavallo decided to write an opera in response: one act composed in the verismo style.

Leoncavallo based the story of Pagliacci on an incident from his childhood: the 1865 murder of a Leoncavallo family servant, Gaetano Scavello, killed by Gaetano D'Alessandro, with brother Luigi acting as accomplice. The incident stemmed from a series of perceived romantic entanglements involving Scavello, Luigi D'Alessandro, and a village girl with whom both men were infatuated. Leoncavallo's father, a judge, presided as magistrate over the criminal investigation.

Leoncavallo originally titled his story Il pagliaccio (The Clown). The baritone Victor Maurel, who was cast as the first Tonio, requested that Leoncavallo change the title from the singular Il pagliaccio to the plural Pagliacci, to broaden dramatic interest from Canio alone to include Tonio (his own role).

The French author Catulle Mendès sued Leoncavallo for plagiarism after learning of the plot of Leoncavallo's libretto from an 1894 French translation. Mendès thought it resembled his 1887 play La Femme de Tabarin, which was structured as a play-within-the-play and featured a clown murdering his wife. Leoncavallo pleaded ignorance of Mendès's play. Later, there were counter-accusations that Mendès's play resembled Don Manuel Tamayo y Baus's Un Drama Nuevo (1867). Mendès dropped his lawsuit. Scholar Matteo Sansone has suggested that Leoncavallo had ample opportunity to be exposed to new French art and musical works while living in Paris from 1882 to 1888, including potentially Mendès's play, another version of La femme de Tabarin by Paul Ferrier, and Tabarin, an opera composed by Émile Pessard that was based on Ferrier's play.

Performance history
Pagliacci received mixed critical reviews after its world premiere, but was instantly successful with the public and has remained so ever since. The UK premiere of Pagliacci took place at the Royal Opera House, Covent Garden, in London on 19 May 1893. The US premiere followed a month later at the Grand Opera House in New York on 15 June, with American tenor Agostino Montegriffo as Canio. The Metropolitan Opera first staged the work on 11 December as a double-bill with Orfeo ed Euridice, with Nellie Melba in the role of Nedda.

The Met again staged Pagliacci as a double-bill, this time followed by Cavalleria rusticana on 22 December 1893. The two operas have since been frequently performed as a double-bill, a pairing referred to in the operatic world colloquially as "Cav and Pag". Pagliacci was produced alone in Washington National Opera's November 1997 production by Franco Zeffirelli. The re-organised New York City Opera presented Pagliacci in 2016 on a double bill with Rachmaninoff's Aleko.

Roles

Synopsis
Place: Calabria, near Montalto, on the Feast of the Assumption
Time: between 1865 and 1870

Prologue
During the overture, the curtain rises. From behind a second curtain, Tonio, dressed as his commedia dell'arte character Taddeo, addresses the audience ("Si può?... Si può?... Signore! Signori! ... Un nido di memorie"). He reminds the audience that actors have feelings too, and that the show is about real people.

Act 1
At three o'clock in the afternoon, the commedia troupe enters the village to the cheering of the villagers. Canio describes the night's performance: the troubles of Pagliaccio. As Nedda steps down from the cart, Tonio offers his hand, but Canio pushes him aside and helps her down himself.

The villagers suggest drinking at the tavern. Canio and Beppe accept, but Tonio stays behind. The villagers tease Canio that Tonio is planning an affair with Nedda. Canio warns everyone that while he may act the foolish husband in the play, in real life he will not tolerate other men making advances to Nedda. Shocked, a villager asks if Canio really suspects her. He says no, and sweetly kisses her on the forehead. As the church bells ring vespers, he and Beppe leave for the tavern, leaving Nedda alone.

Nedda is frightened by Canio's vehemence ("Qual fiamma avea nel guardo"), but the birdsong comforts her ("Stridono lassù"). Tonio returns and confesses his love for her, but she laughs. Enraged, Tonio grabs Nedda, but she takes a whip, strikes him and drives him off. Silvio, who is Nedda's lover, comes from the tavern, where he has left Canio and Beppe drinking. He asks Nedda to elope with him after the performance and, though she is afraid, she agrees. Tonio, who has been eavesdropping, leaves to inform Canio so that he might catch Silvio and Nedda together. Canio and Tonio return and, as Silvio escapes, Nedda calls after him, "I will always be yours!"

Canio chases Silvio, but does not catch him and does not see his face. He demands that Nedda tell him the name of her lover, but she refuses. He threatens her with a knife, but Beppe disarms him. Beppe insists that they prepare for the performance. Tonio tells Canio that her lover will give himself away at the play. A heartbroken Canio is left alone to put on his costume and prepare to laugh ("Vesti la giubba" – "Put on the costume").

Act 2
As the crowd arrives, Nedda, costumed as Colombina, collects their money. She whispers a warning to Silvio, and the crowd cheers as the play begins.

Colombina's husband Pagliaccio has gone away until morning, and Taddeo is at the market. Alone, she anxiously awaits her lover Arlecchino, who comes to serenade her ("") from beneath her window. Taddeo returns and confesses his love, but she mocks him. She lets Arlecchino in through the window. He boxes Taddeo's ears and kicks him out of the room, and the audience laughs.

Arlecchino and Colombina dine, and he gives her a sleeping potion to use later, "so that when Pagliaccio returns, she can drug him and elope with Arlecchino." Taddeo then bursts in, warning them that Pagliaccio is suspicious of his wife and is about to return. As Arlecchino escapes through the window, Colombina tells him, "I will always be yours!"

As Pagliaccio enters, he hears Colombina speak this line and, now as Canio, exclaims "" – "Name of God! Those same words!" He tries to continue the play, but loses control and demands to know her lover's name. Nedda, hoping to keep to the performance, calls Canio by his stage name "Pagliaccio" to remind him of the audience's presence. He answers with his arietta: "" – "I am not Pagliaccio!" He sings that if his face is pale, it is not from the stage makeup but from the shame she has brought him. The crowd is impressed by his emotional performance and cheers him, without realizing that it is real.

Nedda, trying to continue the play, admits that she has been visited by the innocent "Arlecchino". Canio, furious and forgetting the play, demands the name of her lover. Nedda swears she will never tell him, and it becomes apparent that they are not acting. Side-stage, Beppe asks Tonio to intervene, but Tonio refrains and prevents Beppe from halting the action. Silvio begins to fight his way toward the stage. Canio, grabbing a knife from the table, stabs Nedda. As she dies, she calls: "Help! Silvio!" Silvio attacks Canio, but Canio kills him as well. The horrified audience then hears the celebrated final line:
 "!" – "The comedy is finished!"

Assignment of the final line
In the original manuscript, Tonio sang the opera's final line, "", paralleling the prologue, also sung by Tonio. The appropriation of this final line by Canio dates back to 1895. John Wright has analysed the dramaturgy of the opera in the context of assignment of the final line, and concluded that the original assignment of the final line to Tonio is the most consistent and appropriate assignment. Wright says that Tonio shows more deliberate control in his manipulation of the other characters in order to obtain his revenge upon Nedda, after she has rejected him, and is more aware of the demarcation between life and art. By contrast, Canio is unaware of the behind-the-scenes manipulations and surrenders control of his perception of the difference between life and art as the opera proceeds.

In the present day, the assignment of the final line to Canio has continued to be standard. Several exceptions, where Tonio delivers the final line, include:
 The December 1959 production at the Royal Opera House, Covent Garden, directed by Franco Zeffirelli
 A 1968 RAI-TV production directed by Herbert von Karajan
 The HMV recording conducted by Riccardo Muti (EMI CMS7 63650-2)
 The Philips recording conducted by Muti (Philips 0289 434 1312), in conjunction with live performances in Philadelphia in February 1992
 The 1998 English-language recording on Chandos (CHAN 3003)
 The 2007 Teatro Real production directed by Giancarlo del Monaco, in which Tonio's prologue is inserted into the double-bill before the overture to Cavalleria rusticana, the finale of which segues directly into the first act of Pagliacci (Opus Arte OA0983D)
 The 2008 Seattle Opera production
 The 2010 Opera Grand Rapids production
 The 2014 San Diego Opera production
The 2015 Metropolitan Opera production

Orchestration
The orchestra consists of 2 flutes, 1 piccolo, 2 oboes, 1 cor anglais, 2 clarinets, 1 bass clarinet, 3 bassoons, 4 horns, 3 trumpets, 3 trombones, 1 tuba, 2 harps, timpani, tubular bells, percussion (triangle, cymbals, bass drum, glockenspiel, and tam-tam) and strings. Additionally, there is an onstage violin, oboe, trumpet, and bass drum.

Recordings and other media

In 1907, Pagliacci was the first opera to be recorded in its entirety, with the Puerto Rican tenor Antonio Paoli as Canio and under Leoncavallo's personal supervision. In 1931, it became the first complete opera to be filmed with sound, in a now-obscure version starring the tenor Fernando Bertini as Canio, in his only film, with the San Carlo Opera Company. Franco Zeffirelli directed his 1981 La Scala production with Plácido Domingo and Teresa Stratas for a 1982 television airing, which has since been released on DVD. The movie's soundtrack received a Grammy nomination for Best Opera Recording. Pagliacci was also recorded in English in 1997, and released commercially in 1998, for the Chandos "Opera in English" label with Dennis O'Neill as Canio, Alan Opie as Tonio, and Rosa Mannion as Nedda.

Notes

References

Bibliography

Further reading
 Haggin, Bernard H., Conversations with Toscanini, New York: Doubleday & Company, Inc., 1959

External links

 
 Libretto in Italian
 Libretto in English
 The Durbeck Archive, page on 1931 film of Pagliacci
 List of Pagliacci recordings on operadis-opera-discography.org, as of 2009

Operas by Ruggero Leoncavallo
Italian-language operas
Verismo operas
Commedia dell'arte
1892 operas
Operas
Operas set in Italy
Operas adapted into films
Uxoricide in fiction
Works about clowns